The Robert Lindemann House, also known as the Karl Lindemann House, is a Queen Anne style house in rural Enderlin, North Dakota. It was listed on the National Register of Historic Places in 1994.
 
The house was built in 1913 by  Robert Theodore Lindemann (1870–1933) and  Alvina Bertha Fraedrich Lindemann (1883–1980) who  farmed in rural Pontiac Township, Cass County.
The former residence is locally significant as the best preserved Queen Anne style property in the area.  It is a three-story building with an octagonal turret.  The house had remained in the family from its construction in 1913 until at least 1994, although it was unoccupied since 1981.

References

Houses in Cass County, North Dakota
Houses completed in 1913
Houses on the National Register of Historic Places in North Dakota
Queen Anne architecture in North Dakota
1913 establishments in North Dakota
National Register of Historic Places in Cass County, North Dakota